Woodward House is a historic home located in Richmond, Virginia.  The original section was built about 1782.  It was subsequently enlarged to a -story, three bay, frame dwelling.  It sits on a brick basement, has a dormered gable roof, and three exterior end chimneys.  During the first two decades of the 19th century, it was the home of John Woodward, Captain of the Sloop Rachell, and other craft operating from "Rocketts."

It was listed on the National Register of Historic Places in 1974.

References

Houses on the National Register of Historic Places in Virginia
Houses completed in 1782
Houses in Richmond, Virginia
National Register of Historic Places in Richmond, Virginia
1782 establishments in Virginia